Janina Degutytė (6 July 1928 in Kaunas – 6 February 1990 in Vilnius) was a Lithuanian poet, best remembered for her children's poems, lyrical poetry, in the genres of romance and modernism which were published in Lithuanian and Russian, and subsequently translated into Hungarian and Polish.

References 

1928 births
1990 deaths
Lithuanian women poets